Luksika Kumkhum was the defending champion, but lost in the quarterfinals to countrywoman Tamarine Tanasugarn.

An-Sophie Mestach won the title, defeating Shuko Aoyama in the final, 6–1, 6–1.

Seeds

Main draw

Finals

Top half

Bottom half

References 
 Main draw

Dunlop World Challenge - Singles
2014 WS
2014 Dunlop World Challenge